Stewart Palfreyman (born 30 December 1948) is a former Australian rules footballer who played for Geelong in the Victorian Football League (VFL) during the early 1970s.

Palfreyman was a rover and played his early football at Sandy Bay in Tasmania, with his brother Brent.

He spent two seasons in the VFL and missed just five games out of the 44 that Geelong played. Palfreyman then returned to Tasmania and represented the state at the 1972 Perth Carnival.

References

Holmesby, Russell and Main, Jim (2007). The Encyclopedia of AFL Footballers. 7th ed. Melbourne: Bas Publishing.

1948 births
Living people
Geelong Football Club players
Sandy Bay Football Club players
Australian rules footballers from Tasmania